SM City General Santos is a large shopping mall in General Santos, South Cotabato. It is the 45th shopping mall by SM Prime Holdings, the Philippines' largest shopping mall and retail operator. Making it the largest mall in Soccsksargen. It has a gross floor area of 95,764 m2.

It opened to the public on August 10, 2012.

History

Planning
It was reported in 2008 that SM Prime Holdings, the Philippines' largest shopping mall and retail operator, was interested in developing a shopping mall in General Santos. Rival developer Robinsons Land had started construction on a ₱1 trillion (US$75.2 billion) shopping mall set to open in 2009, challenging long-established malls Gaisano and KCC Mall.

Construction
In September 2011, four construction workers working on the mall were injured when a portion of the third floor collapsed as the workers were pouring wet cement. The floor crashed down to the second floor, pinning the workers below. The workers were confined in a local hospital for treatment.

Another construction accident occurred in December 2011, when a platform collapsed as construction workers were installing insulators on the ceiling of the third floor. The workers, who were not wearing safety belts, fell to the concrete floor, resulting in seven workers sustaining varying degrees of injury. The victims were employees of Irvine Construction, one of the construction firms hired by SM Prime Holdings to build the mall.

Opening
SM City General Santos opened on August 10, 2012. At the time of its opening, it was 80% occupied.

References

External links
SM Supermalls - SM City General Santos
SM Supermalls
SM Prime Holdings - SM City General Santos

Shopping malls in the Philippines
Shopping malls established in 2012
SM Prime
Buildings and structures in General Santos
2012 establishments in the Philippines